Olesko is an urban-type settlement in Zolochiv Raion, Lviv Oblast (region) of western Ukraine. It belongs to Busk urban hromada, one of the hromadas of Ukraine. Population: .

It was the seat of the rebbes of Alesk, and also the birthplace of Jan III Sobieski, the King of Poland and Grand Duke of Lithuania.

The earliest mentioned Jewish community is in 1500.   Oles'ko was the place of residence of tzadikim in the 19th century. In 1935 its  Jewish population was 738.

Until 18 July 2020, Olesko belonged to Busk Raion. The raion was abolished in July 2020 as part of the administrative reform of Ukraine, which reduced the number of raions of Lviv Oblast to seven. The area of Busk Raion was merged into Zolochiv Raion.

See also
 Olesko Castle

References

External links
 Images

Urban-type settlements in Zolochiv Raion